Neethi is a 1971 Indian Malayalam-language film, directed by A. B. Raj and produced by Prem Nawas. The film stars Prem Nazir, Sheela, Thikkurissy Sukumaran Nair and Adoor Bhasi in lead roles.

Cast 
Prem Nazir
Sheela
Thikkurissy Sukumaran Nair
Adoor Bhasi
Nellikode Bhaskaran

References

External links 
 

1971 films
1970s Malayalam-language films